Utricularia hydrocarpa is a medium-sized suspended aquatic carnivorous plant that belongs to the genus Utricularia (family Lentibulariaceae). It is probably an annual plant. U. hydrocarpa is native to tropical North and South America.

See also 
 List of Utricularia species

References 

Carnivorous plants of Central America
Carnivorous plants of North America
Carnivorous plants of South America
hydrocarpa